The 1965 Scotch Cup was the seventh edition of the Scotch Cup and was held from 15 to 18 March in Perth, Scotland at the Perth Ice Rink.

Six teams entered the competition with the final seeing the United States claim an upset victory over Canada with the team winning the final two ends of the match to record their first title with a 9-6 victory.

Teams

*Throws third rocks.

Standings

Results

Draw 1

Draw 2

Draw 3

Draw 4

Draw 5

Playoffs

Semifinals

Final

References

External links

World Men's Curling Championship
Scotch Cup
Scotch Cup, 1965
Scotch Cup, 1965
Scotch Cup
Scotch Cup, 1965